The men's javelin throw was a track and field athletics event held as part of the athletics at the 1912 Summer Olympics programme. It was the second appearance of the event. The competition was held on Saturday, July 6, 1912. Twenty-five javelin throwers from seven nations competed. NOCs could enter up to 12 athletes.

Records

These were the standing world and Olympic records (in metres) prior to the 1912 Summer Olympics.

(*) unofficial

Julius Saaristo set at first a new Olympic record with 55.37 m. Eric Lemming improved the record to 57.42 m and finally to 60.64 m. Three days later on July 9, 1912 Julius Saaristo set a new Olympic record in the two handed javelin throw competition with 61.00 m.

Results

Saaristo took the lead after the first throw, and made an even better second throw to stay ahead of Lemming.  On the third throw, however, Saaristo scratched and Lemming threw his javelin well over 57 metres to take the lead going into the finals, with Kóczán wresting third place from Halme on the final throw to advance as well.  While each of the three finalists made improvements in their marks in the final round, no changes in order were made and Lemming's 60.64 metres stood as the new record.

References

Sources
 
 

Athletics at the 1912 Summer Olympics
Javelin throw at the Olympics